Iris bracteata, with common name is Siskiyou iris, is a species of iris.

It is endemic to the Klamath Mountains, in Del Norte County, California, and Curry County, Josephine County, and Jackson County, Oregon, in the United States.

Its flowers grow singly or paired on a stem, and are usually cream-colored or yellowish with purple or brown veining.

External links
Calflora Database: Iris bracteata (Siskiyou iris)
Jepson Manual eFlora (TJM2) treatment of Iris bracteata
USDA Plants Profile for Iris bracteata (Siskiyou iris)
Flora of North America
UC Photos gallery — Iris bracteata

bracteata
Flora of the Klamath Mountains
Flora of California
Flora of Oregon
Endemic flora of the United States
Taxa named by Sereno Watson